Cerosora is a genus of ferns in the subfamily Pteridoideae of the family Pteridaceae.

Species
, Plants of the World Online and the Checklist of Ferns and Lycophytes of the World recognized the following species:
Cerosora argentea (Willd.) Hennequin & H.Schneid.
Cerosora chrysosora (Baker) Domin
Cerosora microphylla (Hook.) R.M.Tryon
Cerosora sumatrana Holttum

References

Pteridaceae
Fern genera
Taxa named by John Gilbert Baker